Cambridge/Reid's Field Airport  is located  northeast of Cambridge, Ontario, Canada.

References

External links
Page about this airport on COPA's Places to Fly airport directory

Registered aerodromes in Ontario
Transport in Cambridge, Ontario